Sun Yue may refer to:

Sun Yue (warlord) (孙岳, 1878–1928), Chinese warlord
Sun Yueh (孫越, 1930–2018), Chinese/Taiwanese actor
Sun Yue (singer) (孙悦, born 1972), Chinese female singer
Sun Yue (volleyball) (孙玥, born 1973), female Chinese volleyball player
Sun Yue (basketball) (孙悦, born 1985), Chinese male basketball player
Sun Yue (curler) (born 1986), Chinese female curler

See also
Sun Yu (disambiguation)